The January 4 Tokyo Dome Show is a professional wrestling event produced annually on January 4 in the Tokyo Dome by New Japan Pro-Wrestling (NJPW), a Japan-based professional wrestling promotion. NJPW has promoted events in the venue every January 4 since Super Warriors in Tokyo Dome in 1992.

The January 4 Tokyo Dome Show became NJPW's premier annual event and the biggest event in Japanese wrestling, similar to what WrestleMania is for WWE and American professional wrestling. It has been described as "the largest professional wrestling show in the world outside of the United States" and the "Japanese equivalent to the Super Bowl". The show expanded to two nights, with the 2020 edition being the first one to include matches on January 5, and further expanded to include a third night (January 8) in 2022. The event would go back to one night in 2023.

The first two January 4 Tokyo Dome Shows were also the last two WCW/New Japan Supershows. Since 2007, when the event was renamed Wrestle Kingdom in Tokyo Dome, the Dome shows have been broadcast on pay-per-view (PPV). All the Dome shows have featured championship matches, including several titles not owned by NJPW. On three occasions (1998, 2006 and 2013), no titles changed hands during the show. The 2019 show, which featured eight title matches, was the first in which all contested titles changed hands.

Some of the earlier January 4 show attendance numbers have been disputed. Officially, the 1993 Tokyo Dome show set the attendance record with 63,500 fans packing the Tokyo Dome, while according to Dave Meltzer, the 1998 show holds the record with an attendance of 55,000. The lowest attendances for any Dome Shows were for the 2021 event, held under attendance restrictions due to COVID-19; NJPW announced an attendance of 12,689 for the first night and 7,801 for the second. Prior to COVID-19, the 2007 and 2011 Dome shows drew the lowest unofficial gates, with only 18,000 in attendance.

As of 2021, the January 4 shows (including matches held on January 5 as part of two-night events) have hosted 328 matches (not including dark or pre-show matches), 126 of which were title matches leading to 69 title changes in total. The 2005 Tokyo Dome show had a 16-match card, the largest of any single-night show, while 2001, 2002, 2007, 2013, 2016, 2018 and 2019 featured 9 matches, the lowest number of matches on a single-night show (again, not counting dark or pre-show matches). The first two-night show in 2020 featured a total of 16 matches, tying the 2005 show for the most in a single event, but each night featured only eight matches, fewer than any previous Dome Show card. The second two-night show in 2021, affected by COVID-19, had only 6 matches scheduled for each night.

Events

See also

List of New Japan Pro-Wrestling pay-per-view events
Professional wrestling at the Tokyo Dome

Footnotes

References

External links
The official New Japan website

 
Recurring events established in 1992
1992 establishments in Japan